Castle Carra is a hall house and National Monument located in County Mayo, Ireland.

Location

It lies on the edge of Black Hole, the deepest part of the lake.

History

Castle Carra was built by Adam de Staunton (Staundun), an Anglo-Norman subject of the de Burgo, in the 13th century. The plinth, bawn, outbuilding and gateways were added by the MacEvilly (Mac an Mhilidh).

The castle was surrendered to the Crown in the 1570s and granted to Captain William Bowen, who strengthened the bawn with a circular flanker with gunloops facing inland.

Sir Roebuck Lynch's lands were seized by the Cromwellians and he was compensated by lands at Castle Carra during the early seventeenth century. It passed to Sir Henry Lynch, 3rd Baronet in the 1660s, and his descendants held it until the 19th century.

Building

Castle Carra is a rectangular hall house.

References

National Monuments in County Mayo
Castles in County Mayo